Benjamin Willard, Jr. (19 March 1743 Grafton, Massachusetts – 18 September 1803 Baltimore, Maryland), was an American clockmaker.

Biography
Benjamin Willard the third eldest of twelve born to the marriage of Benjamin Willard (1716–1775) and Sarah Brooks (1717–1775). He was the first of the Willard family to enter the business of clockmaking, a craft which he began around 1765. He operated a workshop at his family home in Grafton, but by December 1771, lived in Roxbury, Massachusetts.

Benjamin Willard, Jr., died in Baltimore, Maryland, September 18, 1803.

Legacy
Although not as famous as his younger brother, Simon, Benjamin nonetheless was a prominent and well-known clockmaker in his day.  A number of Benjamin Willard clocks survive today and are considered collectible. The Willard home and workshop in Grafton are preserved and operate as a museum.

Family 
Benjamin Willard, Jr. – the eldest of four clockmaker brothers – flourished in central Massachusetts during the late  18th and early  19th centuries.

The other clockmaker brothers were:
 Simon (1753–1823)
 Ephraim (1755–1832)
 Aaron(1757–1844)

Benjamin Willard was a 2nd great-grandson (5th generation descendant) of Simon Willard (1605–1676), a Massachusetts colonist.

Bibliography

Notes

References linked to notes 

  ; .
  ;  (book);  (Chapter 6).

  ; .
<li>
<li>
<li>
<li>
<li>

External links 
Willard House and Clock Museum

1743 births
1803 deaths
American clockmakers
Benjamin